John Elmer (22 March 1905 – 4 August 1993) was an  Australian rules footballer who played with South Melbourne in the Victorian Football League (VFL).

Notes

External links 

1905 births
1993 deaths
Australian rules footballers from Tasmania
Sydney Swans players
North Launceston Football Club players